Festuca longipes is a species of grass in the family Poaceae. It is native to South Africa. It is perennial and mainly grows in subtropical biomes. Festuca longipes was first published in 1900 by Otto Stapf.

References

longipes
Flora of South Africa
Plants described in 1900
Taxa named by Otto Stapf